Mappillai Manasu Poopola is a 1996 Tamil-language comedy film directed by Kuruvikkarambai Shanmugam. The film stars Pandiarajan and Yuvarani, with Vennira Aadai Moorthy, Malaysia Vasudevan, newcomer Rajaneesh Kumar, Bhagyashree, Vichithra, Pollachi Babu, Sriraj Guhan and S. N. Lakshmi playing supporting roles. It was released on 12 April 1996.

Plot

Manikkam (Pandiarajan) and Raja (Rajaneesh Kumar) are best friends, they are folk singers and they study a Ph.D. in Naattupurapaattu specialty in the city. The two friends are from the same village. Raja lives with his grandmother (S. N. Lakshmi) whereas Manikkam lives with his father (Thideer Kannaiah) and mother (Srimathi). Overnight, Raja starts to act like a lunatic and his behavior worsens with time. Worried about his mental health, his grandmother and Manikkam admit him in a mental hospital. Raja stays in the hospital for a week. The doctor says that his situation is improving and that Raja can be discharged from the hospital but he is not completely recovered.

Raja seems to be normal now but sooner or later he can react like a wild person. For his study, Raja has a last oral examination to earn a Ph.D. degree. Manikkam knows that Raja will not pass it with his mental health, so during the oral examination, Manikkam does many cheap tricks to help his friend Raja and Raja finally gets his doctorate diploma.

Manikkam has a maternal uncle Ulaganathan (Vennira Aadai Moorthy) in his native village, as per the village custom, Manikkam must marry Ponni (Yuvarani). Aandhi Thevar (Malaysia Vasudevan) is a rich landlord and Ulaganathan's friend, he wants his daughter Vasanthi (Bhagyashree) to marry Raja, who is from distant family.

Raja receives a letter from Aandhi Thevar, he wants him to come to his village to marry his daughter. Thereafter, Raja, his grandmother and Manikkam go to their native village. Soon, the perfectly normal Manikkam is mistaken to be a madman by the villagers whereas the mentally ill Raja is seen as a sane person. What transpires next forms the rest of the story.

Cast

Pandiarajan as Manikkam
Yuvarani as Ponni
Vennira Aadai Moorthy as Ulaganathan, as Ponni's father
Malaysia Vasudevan as Aandhi Thevar
Rajaneesh Kumar as Raja
Bhagyashree as Vasanthi
Vichithra as Ganga
Pollachi Babu as Periya Minor
Sriraj Guhan as Chinna Minor
S. N. Lakshmi as Raja's grandmother
M. Varalakshmi as Aandhi Thevar's wife
M. R. Sulakshana as Ponni's mother
Srimathi as Manikkam's mother
Pasi Narayanan
Thideer Kannaiah as Manikkam's father
Hercules Douglas as Thangavel
Periyar Dasan as Dr. Kayalventhan

Soundtrack

The film score and the soundtrack were composed by Deva. The soundtrack, released in 1996, features 5 tracks with lyrics written by Kuruvikkarambai Shanmugam.

References

1996 films
1990s Tamil-language films
Indian comedy films
Films about mental health
Films scored by Deva (composer)
1996 comedy films